Ronald Paul Isaac Talakoski (June 1, 1962 – July 6, 2009) was a Canadian professional ice hockey right winger who played nine games in the National Hockey League with the New York Rangers between 1986 and 1988.

Talakoski spent four years at the University of Manitoba. In October, 1986 he signed as a free agent with the New York Rangers and played three games for the club that season. The rest of his rookie pro year was spent in the AHL and IHL. In 1987-88 he played a half dozen games for the Blueshirts then scored 24 goals for the IHL's Colorado Rangers before retiring. Talakoski also served as a firefighter in Thunder Bay, Ontario for 18 years. Talakoski was found dead by Thunder Bay Fire and Rescue Services after a short search near Pier 3 in Thunder Bay, after having been reported missing from his residence. He is reported to have suffered from Shy–Drager syndrome.

References

External links

1962 births
2009 deaths
Canadian ice hockey right wingers
Colorado Rangers players
Deaths from multiple system atrophy
Neurological disease deaths in Ontario
Ice hockey people from Ontario
Sportspeople from Thunder Bay
Flint Spirits players
Manitoba Bisons ice hockey players
New Haven Nighthawks players
New York Rangers players
Thunder Bay Senators players
Undrafted National Hockey League players